The R.C. Williams Warehouse is a Modern Movement style building in Chelsea, Manhattan, New York City designed by architect Cass Gilbert. It is located on the west side of 10th Avenue between 25th and 26th Streets and was built for a wholesale grocery company, the R.C. Williams Company.  The design is a smaller version of Gilbert's design for the Brooklyn Army Terminal.

The building was listed on the National Register of Historic Places in 2005. Avenues: The World School, a private school, now occupies the building.

See also 
 Austin, Nichols and Company Warehouse, also designed by Cass Gilbert, in Williamsburg, Brooklyn
 Brooklyn Army Terminal, also designed by Cass Gilbert, in Sunset Park, Brooklyn

References

Commercial buildings on the National Register of Historic Places in Manhattan
Commercial buildings in Manhattan
Modern Movement architecture
Cass Gilbert buildings
Chelsea, Manhattan